Qobustan or Gobustan may refer to:
 Gobustan District, Azerbaijan
 Qobustan (town), administrative center of Gobustan District, Azerbaijan
 Qobustan, Baku, a settlement and municipality in Azerbaijan
 Gobustan National Park, World Heritage Site near Qobustan, Baku
 Gobustan State Reserve, located in Qobustan, Baku
 Qobustan, Absheron, a village in Azerbaijan